In 2017, U.S. states proposed or are expected to propose cannabis reform legislation for medical marijuana and non-medical adult use. State-level legalization remains at odds with cannabis' status as a Schedule I narcotic under the Controlled Substances Act at the Federal level, and the Cannabis policy of the Donald Trump administration remains unclear as of early 2017.

States that were expected to propose legislation included Delaware, Rhode Island, New Jersey, Texas, Virginia, Kentucky, New Mexico, Vermont, and Missouri.

References

External links
Marijuana on the ballot at Ballotpedia

Cannabis reform proposals 2017
Cannabis reform 2017

2017 United States
Reform proposals 2017